Cryptocoryne cruddasiana is a plant species belonging to the Araceae genus Cryptocoryne.

Distribution
Endemic to northern Myanmar.

Description
Cryptocoryne cruddasiana is a perennial, rhizomatous, herb that can grow as an emergent (with flowers) or as a submerged aquatic.

References

External links
Nonindigenous Aquatic Species USA

cruddasiana
Aquatic plants